The 2019 Le Mans Cup, known as the 2019 Michelin Le Mans Cup under sponsorship, was the fourth season of the Le Mans Cup. It began on 13 April at Circuit Paul Ricard and finished on 26 October at the Algarve International Circuit. The series was open to Le Mans Prototypes in the LMP3 class, and grand tourer sports cars in the GT3 class.

Calendar
All races supported the 2019 European Le Mans Series except the Le Mans round, which was part of the 24 Hours of Le Mans weekend.

Entries

LMP3

GT3

Race results
Bold indicates overall winner.

Standings
Points are awarded according to the following structure (except Le Mans):

For Le Mans:

LMP3 Teams Championship

GT3 Teams Championship

LMP3 Drivers Championship

GT3 Drivers Championship

References

External links
 

2019 in motorsport
2019 in European sport